Gunjan Bhardwaj is an Indian film and television actor from the state of Assam. He made his acting debut in the 2014 Assamese film TRP aru.... Gunjan Bhardwaj had played the lead role in popular Assamese feature film Ahetuk. His notable Assamese films are Tumi Aahibaane, Priyar Priyo, Eraxutir Dhol  and Calendar.

Filmography
Gunjan Bhardwaj start his career by acting in music videos. After the producers saw his potential, he got a break in the film world. In 2014 his first film TRP Aru was released in the theatres. Ahetuk is his second film directed by Bani Das where Amrita Gogoi is cast opposite him. Gunjan has acted in four big budgets Assamese film of 2017 including Calendar, Ruff and Tuff, Tumi Aahibaane and Priyar Priyo.

References

External links
 

1986 births
Living people
Indian male film actors
Indian male television actors
Male actors from Assam
21st-century Indian actors